Wee Waa Panthers Rugby League Club is an Australian rugby league football club based in Wee Waa, New South Wales formed in the late 1980s. They conduct teams for both junior and senior teams.

Notable Juniors
Jamie Lyon (2000- Parramatta Eels & Manly Sea Eagles)

References 

Rugby league teams in New South Wales
North West Slopes